Tyro is an unincorporated community and census-designated place (CDP) located  west of Lexington and  south of Winston-Salem in Davidson County, North Carolina, United States. As of the 2010 census, the community had a population of 3,879.

Geography
Tyro is located in western Davidson County along North Carolina Highway 150. Neighboring communities include Reeds to the northeast on NC 150, Churchland to the southwest on NC 150, Linwood to the southeast, and the city of Lexington to the east.

Daniel Boone is rumored to have once hidden in the cave from a group of Native Americans who were avidly pursuing him.

Demographics

Historic sites
Haden Place, Capt. John Koonts Jr. Farm, St. Luke's Lutheran Church Cemetery, and Tyro Tavern are listed on the National Register of Historic Places.

Education
Tyro is home to West Davidson High School (2012 Davidson County Quiz Bowl Champs) as well as Tyro Middle School; both of which are part of the Davidson County School System.

References

Census-designated places in Davidson County, North Carolina
Census-designated places in North Carolina